Voisins is the name or part of the name of two communes of France:
Voisins-le-Bretonneux, in the Yvelines département
Quincy-Voisins, in the Seine-et-Marne département